Tyler Scott Rogers (born December 17, 1990) is an American professional baseball pitcher for the San Francisco Giants of Major League Baseball (MLB). 

Rogers played college baseball for Garden City Community College and Austin Peay State University.  Rogers was drafted by the Giants in the 10th round of the 2013 MLB draft. He made his MLB debut in 2019. He led the National League in games pitched in both 2020 and 2021. He is known for his unconventional submarine-style pitching, which is an extreme sidearm motion in which the ball is released below knee-level.

Early life
Rogers attended Chatfield Senior High School in Littleton, Colorado.

College career
Undrafted out of high school, Rogers attended Garden City Community College in Garden City, Kansas. There, in his sophomore year he had a 6–3 win-loss record with a 2.39 earned run average (ERA) in 34 games with 50 strikeouts in 49 innings. He was a second-team All-Kansas Jayhawk Community College Conference selection.

After two seasons, Rogers transferred to Austin Peay State University where he played college baseball for the Governors. There, as a junior transfer in 2012 he was 4–4 with a 2.25 ERA and had 52 strikeouts in 59.2 innings, while making an Ohio Valley Conference record-tying 38 appearances and saving 10 games.

Professional career

Draft and minor leagues
The San Francisco Giants selected Rogers in the 10th round, with the 312th overall selection, of the 2013 MLB draft. He signed for a signing bonus of $7,500. Rogers split his debut season between the Arizona League Giants and the Salem-Keizer Volcanoes, going a combined 1–1 with a 2.30 ERA in 27 innings. He split the 2014 season between the Augusta GreenJackets and the San Jose Giants, pitching to a 4–0 record with two saves and a 1.81 ERA in  innings. 

Rogers split the 2015 season between San Jose and the Richmond Flying Squirrels, going 5–2 with one save and a 2.00 ERA in  innings. He split the 2016 season between Richmond and the Sacramento River Cats, going 2–2 with 11 saves and a 3.27 ERA in 66 innings. He then played in the AFL for Scottsdale, and was named an AFL Rising Star.

Rogers spent the 2017 season with Sacramento, going 4–4 with 10 saves and a 2.37 ERA in 76 innings. He was named a PCL mid-season All Star. He returned to Sacramento for the 2018 season, going 3–2 with three saves and a 2.13 ERA in  innings. He was again named a PCL mid-season All Star.

Rogers returned to Sacramento in 2019 season, going 4–2 with five saves and a 4.21 ERA and 55 strikeouts over 62 innings for them.

San Francisco Giants (2019–present)
On August 27, 2019, the Giants selected Rogers' contract and promoted him to the major leagues. He made his debut that night versus the Arizona Diamondbacks, pitching a scoreless inning in relief. Rogers finished the 2019 season going 2–0 with a 1.02 ERA and 16 strikeouts over  innings for the Giants. In 2019, his four-seam fastball was on average the slowest in major league baseball, at 83.1 mph, as was his sinker, at 82.2 mph. 

In 2020, Rogers was 3-3 with three saves, 10 holds (tied for 3rd-most in MLB), and a 4.50 ERA in a National League-leading 29 games. He pitched 28 innings, in which he averaged 1.9 walks per 9 innings. Balls hit against him had the second-lowest "barrel" percentage in the NL, at 2.0%. His sinker was again on average the slowest in major league baseball, at 82.4 mph, his slider was the slowest in major league baseball at 71.4 mph, and his fastball was in the slowest 1% in MLB, at 82.5 mph.

In the 2021 regular season, Rogers was 7-1 with 13 saves, 30 holds (3rd-most in MLB), and a 2.22 ERA. He led the National League, for the second year in a row, with 80 games pitched, and pitched 81 innings in which he averaged 1.4 walks per 9 innings (his 4.0% walk rate was in the best 2% in MLB). Balls hit against him had the second-slowest exit velocity of those hit against any NL pitcher, at 84.6 mph, and the "barrel" percentage of balls hit against him was the lowest in the major leagues at 2.0%. His salary was $583,000.  In 2021, his fastball was on average the slowest in major league baseball, at 83.0 mph, as was his sinker for the third season in a row, at 82.8 mph, and his slider for the second season in a row, at 71.9 mph.

In 2022 with the Giants, Rogers was 3-4 with a 3.57 ERA. He pitched in 68 games (6th in the NL), in which he pitched 75.2 innings. Balls hit against him had the slowest exit velocity of those hit against any pitcher, at 84.2 mph, and the "barrel" percentage of balls hit against him was the fifth-lowest in the major leagues at 2.8%. His fastball velocity was on average 83.2 mph, in the slowest 1% in baseball for the fourth season in a row, his average sinker was 83 mph, and his average slider was 72 mph.

On January 13, 2023, Rogers agreed to a one-year, $1.675 million contract with the Giants, avoiding salary arbitration.

Personal life
Tyler's older identical mirror image twin brother, Taylor, is also a pitcher in MLB. The brothers became the 5th set of twins to play in MLB.

References

External links

Austin Peay Governors bio

1990 births
Living people
Sportspeople from Littleton, Colorado
Baseball players from Colorado
Major League Baseball pitchers
San Francisco Giants players
Garden City Broncbusters baseball players
Austin Peay Governors baseball players
Arizona League Giants players
Salem-Keizer Volcanoes players
Augusta GreenJackets players
San Jose Giants players
Scottsdale Scorpions players
Richmond Flying Squirrels players
Sacramento River Cats players
Toros del Este players
American expatriate baseball players in the Dominican Republic
Identical twins
Twin sportspeople
American twins